Weekday Warrior is a mod for the video game Half-Life 2. It was developed by students at The Guildhall at SMU and released in its final state on 7 June 2006.

Weekday Warrior received the Best Mod and best Best Singleplayer FPS Mod awards in the 2007 Independent Games Festival.

References

External links
Official site

2006 video games
Adventure games
Source (game engine) mods
Video games developed in the United States
Windows games
Independent Games Festival winners